Lomidze is a Georgian surname. Notable people with the surname include:

Lasha Lomidze (born 1992), Georgian rugby player
Mamuka Lomidze (born 1984), Georgian footballer
Shota Lomidze (1936–1993), Georgian sport wrestler
Viktor Lomidze, Georgian-Polish military officer
Konstantin Lomidze, Chief Financial Officer of World Learning

Surnames of Georgian origin
Georgian-language surnames
Surnames of Abkhazian origin